This is a list of major political controversies in Australia:

Pre-federation

Federal controversies

Barton government

Deakin government

Hughes government

Bruce–Page government

Scullin government

Lyons government

Menzies government (I)

Curtin government

Chifley government

Menzies government (II)

Holt government

Whitlam government

Fraser government

Hawke government

Keating government

Howard government

Rudd government

Gillard government

Abbott government

Turnbull government

Morrison government

State controversies

New South Wales

Queensland

South Australia

Tasmania

Victoria

Western Australia

References

Further reading

Political controversies in Australia
Controversies
Australia